Bobbi Starr (born 1983) is an American former pornographic actress. She won the AVN Award for Female Performer of the Year in 2012.

Early life and education 
Starr expressed an ambition to study pre-med with the aim of becoming a gynecologist. Her intent was to work within the adult entertainment industry, where she identified a lack of female gynecologists.

Career 
Starr was named by CNBC as one of the 12 most popular pornographic film actresses in 2011 and 2013.
Starr has directed films for adult film distributor Evil Angel, beginning with Bobbi's World (2011), a female POV movie.

Starr was a finalist for the reality show America's Next Hot Porn Star, a series set up similarly to America's Next Top Model. She blogged for Popporn.com and wrote a column for Fox Magazine called "Adventures in Porny Land", and was featured in a book by Frederick Community College professor Rich Moreland about feminists in the pornography industry.

Personal life 
Starr has said she does not label her sexual orientation, but considers herself "more gay than straight".
In 2013, Starr announced on her blog that she was expecting a child.

Awards

References

Further reading

External links 

 
 
 

Year of birth missing (living people)
Living people
American female adult models
American pornographic film actresses
Women pornographic film directors
21st-century American women